Daniel Vaudd (pronounced ‘vode’) is a perfumer residing in London. Daniel Vaudd changed his name from Kenlee Daniel. A certified Cosmetic Scientist, Daniel trained under evaluative perfumer John Ayres, the Director of the UK Fragrance Foundation, who taught him clarity and structure of perfume and how to refine his abilities. Soon, he was asked to become the Global Colour Cosmetic Researcher for a major multinational, developing new and individual colours, as well as fragrances, for their cosmetic ranges.

A chance encounter at the Knightsbridge Haute Parfumerie of the world’s sole ‘Professeur de parfum’, Roja Dove, led Dove to ask Daniel to be his personal researcher on the project ‘Essence of Perfume’ by Roja Dove. With his instincts and talents and his ever-broadening abilities and experience, Daniel soon began receiving requests to craft bespoke perfumes himself.

In 2009 Daniel Launched his own line of perfume and cosmetic products - The House of Daniel Vaudd.

References

Living people
Year of birth missing (living people)
Place of birth missing (living people)
Perfumers